Rayene Stewart Simpson,  (16 February 1926 – 18 October 1978) was an Australian recipient of the Victoria Cross, the highest award for gallantry "in the face of the enemy" that can be awarded to members of the British and Commonwealth armed forces. Simpson received his award for actions in Kon Tum Province, South Vietnam on 6 May 1969.

Early life
Rayene Stewart Simpson was born on 16 February 1926 at Redfern in Sydney, the third child of New South Wales-born parents Robert William Simpson, labourer, and his wife Olga Maude, née Montgomery. Olga deserted her husband and children about 1931. Ray was separated from his siblings and placed in the Church of England Home for Boys in Carlingford. Educated at a local school and at Dumaresq Island Public School, Taree, he worked as a labourer.

Military career
Simpson joined the Second Australian Imperial Force on 15 March 1944 and was posted to the 41st/2nd Battalion, a militia battalion that served as a holding unit for soldiers under 19 years of age. With this battalion, he was posted to Cowra as part of the prisoner of war camp garrison which had been reinforced after the Cowra breakout on 5 August 1944. He was subsequently posted to the 2/3rd Pioneer Battalion, while subsequent postings included the Advanced Ordnance Depot and the 26th Battalion. During this time he served in Morotai, Tarakan and Rabaul.

Demobilized in January 1947, Simpson spent four years working in various jobs in Australia and Papua New Guinea, before re-enlisting in the Army in 1951 to serve in the Korean War with the 3rd Battalion, Royal Australian Regiment. He was promoted to lance corporal on 30 November 1951 and again to corporal on 21 January 1953. He married Shoko Sakai, a Japanese citizen, on 5 March 1952.

Simpson was posted to the 2nd Battalion, Royal Australian Regiment in January 1954, where he was promoted to sergeant in 1955, serving in Malaya from October 1955 for the next two years. He was subsequently posted to 1st Special Air Service Company (SAS) in November 1957 and served with that unit until selected as one of the initial group members of the Australian Army Training Team Vietnam (AATTV) sent to assist South Vietnamese forces in July 1962. A year later, he returned to the SAS in Australia and served there for the next twelve months.

His second tour of duty with AATTV in Vietnam commenced in July 1964, after being promoted to warrant officer class II. During his second tour, he was awarded the Distinguished Conduct Medal for his actions when a patrol was ambushed at Tako on 16 September. Simpson, although severely wounded in the leg, held off the enemy while he called for assistance by radio. He and his men repelled several enemy assaults until help arrived, and none too soon as their ammunition was almost gone and Simpson was weak from loss of blood.  He was evacuated by helicopter to the 6th Field Hospital at Nha Trang and later convalesced in Tokyo. On return to Australia, he was posted to the 1st Battalion, Royal New South Wales Regiment (Commando) in Sydney in January 1966.

On 16 May 1966, Simpson left the army for a second time, but re-enlisted in Saigon a year later for his third period of service with the AATTV, during which he was awarded the Victoria Cross. He also received the United States Silver Star and Bronze Star for his actions in Vietnam.

Victoria Cross
Simpson was 43 years old, and a warrant officer class II in the AATTV, when he was awarded the Victoria Cross. On 6 May 1969, in Kon Tum Province, Simpson rescued a wounded fellow warrant officer and carried out an unsuccessful attack on a strong enemy position. On 11 May he fought alone against heavy odds to cover the evacuation of a number of casualties. Simpson was presented his Victoria Cross from Queen Elizabeth II, at Government House in Sydney on 1 May 1970.

Victoria Cross citation
The citation in the Commonwealth of Australia Gazette of 28 August 1969, which announced Simpson's award reads:

Later life
Simpson took his final discharge from the army in May 1970. In 1972 he took up a position as administrative officer at the Australian Embassy in Tokyo. He died of cancer in Tokyo on 18 October 1978 and was buried at the Yokohama War Cemetery, Japan. His Victoria Cross and portrait are displayed at the Australian War Memorial in Canberra.

Notes

References

Further reading

External links
WOII  R.S. SIMPSON, VC, DCM (biography plus detailed action account)

1926 births
1978 deaths
Military personnel from New South Wales
Australian Army soldiers
Australian military personnel of the Korean War
Australian military personnel of the Malayan Emergency
Australian military personnel of the Vietnam War
Australian Army personnel of World War II
Australian recipients of the Victoria Cross
People from Sydney
Australian recipients of the Distinguished Conduct Medal
Foreign recipients of the Silver Star
Vietnam War recipients of the Victoria Cross
Deaths from cancer in Japan